Sean E. Tarwater, Sr. (born February 25, 1969) is an American politician who has served in the Kansas House of Representatives from the 27th district since 2017.

Political career 

Tarwater was first elected to represent District 27 in the Kansas House of Representatives in 2016. He was re-elected in 2018 and 2020.

Electoral history

References

1969 births
Living people
Republican Party members of the Kansas House of Representatives
21st-century American politicians
People from Stilwell, Kansas
Politicians from Kansas City, Kansas
University of Missouri–Kansas City alumni